Pötschke is a German language surname. It stems from the male given name Peter – and may refer to:
Martina Pötschke-Langer (1951), German public health activist
Oliver Pötschke (1987), German footballer
Werner Pötschke (1914–1945), German SS-Sturmbannführer

References 

German-language surnames
Surnames from given names